Julie Brook (born 1961) is a British artist.  She works in a variety of mediums in each case with a strong connection with the landscape.  She has lived and worked in the Orkney islands, on Jura and Mingulay and in the Libyan Desert.

Life and career
Julie Brook was born at RAF Rinteln hospital in Germany.  She lives on the Isle of Skye. She attended The Ruskin School of Drawing and Fine Art in Oxford from 1980 to 1983.

Artworks
Her works include:
 An Dealbh Mòr (2005–2006), with Bun Sgoil Shlèite, a Gaelic/ English year-long project drawing and painting from the landscape of South Skye culminating in a large scale painting on canvas. Using the painting as a floor cloth the performance reflected the geological evolution of Skye through movement and music.  Exhibition and performance situated at Sabhal Mòr Ostaig, Isle of Skye and presented at the Scottish Parliament.

See also
 Art of the United Kingdom

References

External links
 Official Julie Brook Website

1961 births
Living people
Scottish women artists
British women painters
21st-century British women artists